The Roman Catholic Diocese of Grand-Bassam is a diocese located in the city of Grand-Bassam in the Ecclesiastical province of Abidjan in Côte d'Ivoire.

History
 June 8, 1982: Established as Diocese of Grand-Bassam from the Metropolitan Archdiocese of Abidjan

Special churches
The Cathedral is the Cathédrale Sacré Cœur in Grand-Bassam.

Bishops
 Bishops of Grand-Bassam (Roman rite)
 Bishop Joseph Akichi (1982.06.08 – 1993.04.05)
 Bishop Paul Dacoury-Tabley (1994.12.19 - 2010.03.27)
 Bishop Raymond Ahoua, F.D.P. (since 2010.03.27)

Other priest of this diocese who became bishop
Jacques Assanvo Ahiwa, appointed auxiliary bishop of Bouaké in 2020

See also
Roman Catholicism in Côte d'Ivoire
 List of Roman Catholic dioceses in Côte d'Ivoire

Sources
 GCatholic.org
 Catholic Hierarchy

Grand-Bassam
Grand-Bassam
Grand-Bassam
Sud-Comoé
1982 establishments in Ivory Coast
Roman Catholic Ecclesiastical Province of Abidjan